Andrew Scott (born 21 October 1976) is an Irish actor. He played Jim Moriarty in the BBC series Sherlock, for which he won the BAFTA Television Award for Best Supporting Actor. Scott's role as the priest on the second series of Fleabag earned a nomination for the Golden Globe Award for Best Supporting Actor – Series, Miniseries or Television Film and won the Critics' Choice Television Award for Best Supporting Actor in a Comedy Series. He won further acclaim playing the lead role of Garry Essendine in a 2019 stage production of Present Laughter at The Old Vic, for which he won the Laurence Olivier Award for Best Actor in a Leading Role in a Play.

Scott has received various other awards, including the Laurence Olivier Award for Outstanding Achievement in an Affiliate Theatre for his role in A Girl in a Car with a Man at the Royal Court Theatre.

Early life and education 
Scott was born in Dublin, Ireland, on 21 October 1976, the son of Nora and Jim Scott. His mother was an art teacher, while his father worked at an employment agency. He is the second of three children. He has an older sister, Sarah, and a younger sister, Hannah. He was raised as a Catholic, but has since left the faith. He attended Gonzaga College while taking weekend classes at Ann Kavanagh's Young People's Theatre in Rathfarnham, and appeared in two ads on Irish television. At 17, he was chosen for a starring role in his first film, Korea. He won a bursary to art school, but elected to study drama at Trinity College Dublin, leaving after six months to join Dublin's Abbey Theatre before moving to London when he was 22. He once stated to the London Evening Standard magazine that he always had a "healthy obsession" with acting.

Career
After filming a small part in Steven Spielberg's Band of Brothers, Scott worked with film and theatre director Karel Reisz in the Gate Theatre, Dublin, production of Long Day's Journey into Night taking the role of Edmund Tyrone, the younger son, in Eugene O'Neill's play about a wealthy but tortured Irish family living in Connecticut during the Gilded Age. He won Actor of the Year at the Sunday Independent Spirit of Life Arts Awards 1998 and received an Irish Times Theatre Award 1998 nomination for Best Supporting Actor.

Scott had the small part of Michael Bodkin in the film Nora, and in a television adaptation of Henry James's The American, before making his London theatre debut in Conor McPherson's Dublin Carol at the Royal Court Theatre. He was cast in the BAFTA-winning drama Longitude, and the HBO miniseries Band of Brothers. Scott has described the working atmosphere on Band of Brothers as "awful".

In 2004, he was named one of European Film Promotions' Shooting Stars. After starring in My Life in Film for the BBC, he received his first Laurence Olivier Award for his role in A Girl in a Car with a Man at The Royal Court, and the Theatregoers' Choice Award for his performance in the Royal National Theatre's Aristocrats. He created the roles of the twin brothers in the original Royal Court production of Christopher Shinn's Dying City, which was later nominated for the Pulitzer Prize. In 2006, he made his Broadway debut in the Music Box Theater production of The Vertical Hour written by David Hare and directed by Sam Mendes, for which he was nominated for a Drama League Award.

Scott appears as Col. William Smith in the 2008 HBO miniseries John Adams. In 2009, he appeared in Sea Wall, a one-man show written especially for him by playwright Simon Stephens.

He starred in a sell-out run of Cock at the Royal Court in late 2009, a production which won an Olivier Award in 2010.

His turn in an episode of Foyle's War, in which he plays a prisoner determined to allow himself to hang for a crime he may not have committed, was described in Slant magazine as a "standout performance".

His film appearances include a role in Chasing Cotards (a short film made for IMAX) and a role in the short film, Silent Things; he plays the role of Paul McCartney in the BBC film Lennon Naked. He also stars in the critically acclaimed 2010 film The Duel.

He is best known for his role as Sherlock Holmes' nemesis Jim Moriarty in the BBC drama series Sherlock.

He had a guest role in the second series of Garrow's Law playing a gay man on trial for sodomy.

In 2010, he appeared in the Old Vic production of Noël Coward's Design for Living.

In 2011, he played the lead role of Julian in Ben Power's adaptation of Henrik Ibsen's epic Emperor and Galilean at the Royal National Theatre in London.

He had a part in BBC Two’s original drama The Hour as Adam Le Ray, a failed, closeted actor.

In addition to his stage and TV work, Scott is also known for his voice acting in radio plays and audiobooks, such as the roles of Jay Gatsby in F. Scott Fitzgerald's The Great Gatsby and Stephen Dedalus in James Joyce's Ulysses.

In November 2013, Scott took part in the Royal National Theatre's 50 Years on Stage, a theatrical event which consisted of excerpts from many plays over the National's fifty-year run and was broadcast live on television. Scott performed a scene from Angels in America by Tony Kushner.

In 2014 Scott took to the stage in Birdland, written by Simon Stephens and directed by Carrie Cracknell at the Royal Court Theatre, playing the central character of Paul, a rock star on the verge of a breakdown. Scott received positive reviews for the performance, with comments such as "beautifully played" and [he] "pulls off the brilliant trick of being totally dead behind the eyes and fascinating at the same time, an appalling creature who's both totem and symptom".

In 2015, he appeared in the James Bond film Spectre, as Max Denbigh, a member of the British government intent on shutting down the Double-0 section.

In 2016, Scott appeared in the romantic drama film This Beautiful Fantastic, directed and written by Simon Aboud.

In 2017, Scott's performance in the title role of Hamlet won critical acclaim and earned him the nomination for Laurence Olivier Award for Best Actor in a Leading Role in a Play. The play was directed by Robert Icke and first produced at the Almeida Theatre. The production was filmed and broadcast on BBC Two at Easter 2018. Scott provided the voice of Obake in Big Hero 6: The Series.

Scott worked with the charity IdeasTap mentoring young actors and helping to start their careers, until the charity closed in June 2015 due to lack of funds.

In 2019, Scott played The Priest in series two of the award-winning BBC Three comedy-drama Fleabag. Also in 2019, he appeared in the Netflix anthology series Black Mirror, as the lead character Chris in the Season 5 episode "Smithereens". In June to August 2019, Scott starred as the matinee idol Garry Essendine in Matthew Warchus's revival of Noël Coward's Present Laughter at the Old Vic in London. He has been cast as Colonel John Parry/Jopari/Stanislaus Grumman in the HBO/BBC adaptation of Philip Pullman's His Dark Materials.

On 25 September 2019, it was announced that Scott had been cast as Tom Ripley in Ripley, a television series to be adapted from Patricia Highsmith's Ripley novels.

Personal life
Scott is gay. He first commented publicly on his sexuality in an interview with The Independent in November 2013. He stated, "Mercifully, these days people don't see being gay as a character flaw. But nor is it a virtue, like kindness. Or a talent, like playing the banjo. It's just a fact. Of course, it's part of my make-up, but I don't want to trade on it." Scott was ranked at No. 22 on The Independents Rainbow List 2014.

Acting credits

Film

Television

Theatre

Awards and nominations
Film and TV

Theatre

Other

References

External links

 
 
 

1976 births
Living people
20th-century Irish male actors
21st-century Irish male actors
Irish male film actors
Irish male Shakespearean actors
Irish male stage actors
Irish male television actors
Male actors from Dublin (city)
Irish gay actors
Best Supporting Actor BAFTA Award (television) winners
Laurence Olivier Award winners
Former Roman Catholics
Irish former Christians
People educated at Gonzaga College